Arthur Nabarrete Zanetti (born April 16, 1990) is a Brazilian artistic gymnast. He won the gold medal in the rings exercise at the 2012 Summer Olympics in London, becoming the first Brazilian and Latin American gymnast to win an Olympic medal in history. He also won the gold medal at the 2013 World Artistic Gymnastics Championships in Antwerp.

Career

Zanetti is a rings exercise specialist. He occasionally competes in floor and vault exercises. He originated one skill, which is named after him in the Code of Points since 2013.

2009
Zanetti competed in 2009 World Artistic Gymnastics Championships in London. He qualified in 8th for Rings Final and placed 4th during Event Finals, scoring 15.325. This was his best result that year.

2011

Zanetti won the gold medal on Rings at the 2011 Summer Universiade, in Shenzhen, China, with a score of 15.600. It was the first medal for a Brazilian male artistic gymnast in this competition.

In Tokyo, Japan, he won the silver medal on rings at the 2011 World Artistic Gymnastics Championships. His score was 15.600, finishing behind the champion, Chen Yibing. With this result, Zanetti qualified to compete at the 2012 Summer Olympics. He was also the first Brazilian to win a medal for the rings event in a World Gymnastics Championships.

At the 2011 Pan American Games, Zanetti won the silver medal on rings. He also won the team title, the first male team gold medal for Brazil at the Pan American Games.

2012

At the 2012 Artistics Gymnastics Olympic Test Event, on January 12, 2012, Zanetti won the gold medal on rings. He achieved good results in Artistic Gymnastics World Cup challenges in this year. In Cottbus, Germany, on March 24, he won the silver medal, while Chen won the gold. On April 30, Zanetti won the gold medal at the Osijek Grand Prix 2012 in Osijek, Croatia. He slightly improved his series, with a 6.8 D-score. In Maribor, Slovenia, on June 2, Zanetti finished first, scoring 15,575.

London Olympics 
Zanetti competed at the 2012 Summer Olympics in London. He qualified to the rings final in 4th place with a score of 15.616.  On August 6, 2012, he won the gold medal in this event, with a score of 15.900. His gold medal was the first medal for a Brazilian gymnast, and also the first for a Latin American gymnast  in any event at the Olympic Games.

2013 
Zanetti participated in two events in the 2013 Artistic Gymnastics World Cup Series. He was the gold medallist in both competitions. In Doha, Qatar, on March 28, he got a score of 15.700  while in Anadia, Portugal, on June 22, his score was 15.800.

Zanetti defended his title in Rings at the 2013 Summer Universiade in Kazan and won the gold medal.

On October 5, Zanetti won the gold medal at the 2013 World Artistic Gymnastics Championships, in Antwerp, Belgium, with a score of 15,800.

2016 
At the 2016 Summer Olympics, Zanetti won another medal on the rings, this time a silver.  He was also part of the Brazilian men's team that finished 6th in the team competition.

2021 
He competed in the Tokyo Olympics, finishing 8th in the rings final.

References

External links

 
 

1990 births
Living people
People from São Caetano do Sul
Brazilian male artistic gymnasts
Brazilian people of Italian descent
Brazilian people of Spanish descent
Medalists at the World Artistic Gymnastics Championships
Competitors at the 2010 South American Games
Gymnasts at the 2011 Pan American Games
Gymnasts at the 2012 Summer Olympics
Competitors at the 2014 South American Games
Gymnasts at the 2015 Pan American Games
Gymnasts at the 2016 Summer Olympics
Competitors at the 2018 South American Games
Gymnasts at the 2019 Pan American Games
Olympic gymnasts of Brazil
Olympic medalists in gymnastics
World champion gymnasts
Olympic gold medalists for Brazil
Olympic silver medalists for Brazil
Medalists at the 2012 Summer Olympics
Medalists at the 2016 Summer Olympics
Pan American Games gold medalists for Brazil
Pan American Games silver medalists for Brazil
Originators of elements in artistic gymnastics
Pan American Games medalists in gymnastics
Universiade medalists in gymnastics
South American Games gold medalists for Brazil
South American Games silver medalists for Brazil
South American Games medalists in gymnastics
Universiade gold medalists for Brazil
Medalists at the 2011 Summer Universiade
Medalists at the 2013 Summer Universiade
Medalists at the 2011 Pan American Games
Medalists at the 2015 Pan American Games
Medalists at the 2019 Pan American Games
Gymnasts at the 2020 Summer Olympics
Sportspeople from São Paulo (state)
21st-century Brazilian people
20th-century Brazilian people